Hylemya is a genus of root-maggot flies in the family Anthomyiidae. There are at least 30 described species in Hylemya.

Species
These 31 species belong to the genus Hylemya:

H. agrestis (Robineau-Desvoidy, 1830) c g
H. alcathoe (Walker, 1849) i c g b
H. autumnalis (Robineau-Desvoidy, 1830) c g
H. brevistyla Suwa, 2002 c g
H. bruneipalpis Fan, 1982 c g
H. detracta (Walker, 1853) c g
H. facilis (Meigen, 1838) c g
H. femoralis (Stein, 1915) c g
H. flavicruralis Suwa, 1989 c g
H. flavipennis (Robineau-Desvoidy, 1830) c g
H. genurfa (Villeneuve, 1911) c g
H. kuntzei (Ringdahl, 1934) c g
H. latevittata (Stein, 1908) c g
H. longirostris Suwa, 1989 c g
H. meigeni (Schnabl, 1911) c g
H. neglecta (Karl, 1943) c g
H. nigrimana (Meigen, 1826) c g
H. nigripes (Robineau-Desvoidy, 1830) c g
H. partita (Meigen, 1826) b
H. probata (Walker, 1861) c g
H. probilis Ackland, 1967 c g
H. rufa (Meigen, 1838) c g
H. seideli (Hering, 1925) c g
H. stackelbergi (Ringdahl, 1934) c g
H. subcilicrura (Séguy, 1937) c g
H. supraorbitalis Fan, 1982 c g
H. takagii Suwa, 1977 c g
H. urbica Wulp, 1896 g
H. vagans (Panzer, 1798) c g
H. variata (Fallén, 1823) c g

Data sources: i = ITIS, c = Catalogue of Life, g = GBIF, b = Bugguide.net

References

Further reading

External links

 

Anthomyiidae
Articles created by Qbugbot
Muscoidea genera